Shatranj is a 1969 Indian Hindi-language spy thriller film co-produced and directed by S. S. Vasan. His final directorial venture, it stars Rajendra Kumar and Waheeda Rehman, with Mehmood, Madan Puri, Shashikala, Helen, Achala Sachdev, Manmohan Krishna and Agha in pivotal roles.

Plot 

Sharda has been married to Thakur for several years, and both have a daughter: Meena. Sharda and Meena suddenly decide to leave India and settle down in a communist country, without letting Thakur know. Concerned about them, Thakur hires Jai, a spy, to locate them, and bring them back if possible. Jai agrees and soon arrives in that country, which is ruled by a military general who has not shown his face to anyone. Jai assumes the identity of Shinraaz, goes around trying to locate the two women, and finds Meena, who works as a dancer in a hotel. Jai eventually learns what brought Meena and her mother to this country, and why they both are not willing to return to India.

Cast 
 Rajendra Kumar as Jay / Vijay / Shinraz
 Waheeda Rehman as Meena
 Mehmood as Ameer
 Madan Puri as Comrade Chang
 Shashikala as Suzy
 Helen as Salma
 Achala Sachdev as Sharda
 Manmohan Krishna as Thakur
 Agha as Comrade Lee Jung

Production 
Shatranj was the final film directed by S. S. Vasan. He co-produced the film with N. N. Sippy under Gemini Studios. Madan Puri's character was modelled after the fictional character Fu Manchu. The film was colourised using Eastmancolor.

Soundtrack 
The music was composed by the duo Shankar–Jaikishan. Hasrat Jaipuri, S. H. Bihari, Indeevar and Kiran Kalyani were the lyricists.

Release and reception 
Shatranj was an "anti-China movie", and theatres screening the film in West Bengal were burnt down by Communist revolutionaries. It was later forcibly removed from exhibition by the Government of that state. In Bathinda, Naxalites tried to blow up the theatre where the film was being screened, but the police successfully removed the bomb before it could do any damage. In a review dated 29 March 1969, the magazine Thought wrote, "Watching a game of shatranj, one needs some intelligence and common sense to follow the opponents' moves and countermoves. Watching Shatranj, the film, one has to suspend both intellect and [judgement]." The film was commercially successful but, according to Vasan's son Balan, "not to the extent expected by the maker".

References

External links 
 

1960s Hindi-language films
1960s spy thriller films
Films directed by S. S. Vasan
Films scored by Shankar–Jaikishan
Gemini Studios films
Indian spy thriller films